Erikson Institute is a graduate school in child development in downtown Chicago, Illinois. It is named for the noted psychoanalyst and developmental psychologist, Erik Erikson.

History and mission
The Institute was founded in 1966 by four child advocates: child psychologist Maria Piers; educator and activist Barbara Taylor Bowman; social worker Lorraine Wallach; and businessman and philanthropist Irving B. Harris.

The Institute was established to provide training for people working in the recently created Head Start program. Its original mission was to provide early childhood teachers and caregivers with a comprehensive education in child development and a clear understanding of the role of family and culture in a child’s life. The mission has expanded to the education of anyone who works with or on behalf of young children.

The Institute’s academic programs, applied research, and community work focus on children from birth through age eight, particularly those at risk for academic failure.

Erikson is led by its fifth president, Mariana Souto-Manning, PhD, who assumed the role on September 1, 2021. She succeeded Geoffrey Nagle, who ended his term as president and CEO in February of that year. Previous presidents include Samuel J. Meisels, who left Erikson to become founding executive director of the University of Nebraska's Buffett Early Childhood Institute.

Erikson Institute is accredited by the Higher Learning Commission and a member of the North Central Association.

Academic programs 
Forty full- and part-time faculty teach approximately 260 masters, 12 doctoral, and 60 certificate students enrolled in the institute’s academic programs:
 Master of science in child development
 Master of science in early childhood education
 Master of science in child development/master of social work (in collaboration with Loyola University Chicago)
 Master of social work (beginning fall 2014)
 Doctorate in child development (in collaboration with Loyola University Chicago)
 Irving B. Harris Infant Specialist Certificate Programs
 Irving B. Harris Infant Mental Health Program
 Bilingual/ESL/Multicultural Certificate Program

Master of science degree programs offer opportunities for specialization in areas that include administration, infancy, bilingual/ESL, and child life.

Professional development programs 
Courses are offered in four categories: early intervention, teaching and learning, supervision and leadership, and infant studies.

Research initiatives 
Current applied research projects focus on after-school programs, assessment in early childhood classrooms, caregivers of substance-exposed infants, early literacy instruction with culturally and linguistically diverse children, Early Head Start, Early Reading First, infant mental health, social-emotional evaluation of children in foster care, early mathematics education, and vocabulary acquisition among ESL preschoolers.

Herr Research Center for Children and Social Policy 
Established in 2005, the center conducts policy research on early childhood issues in the Great Lakes region, including infant mental health and social emotional support services, services and support for immigrant children and their families, and prekindergarten early education initiatives.

Center for Children and Families 
Opened in January 2019, the Center offers assessment and treatment services for children from birth to age eight "inflicted by gun violence, poverty, and other pressing issues." The Center's interdisciplinary team, which includes developmental pediatricians, psychologists, occupational therapists, and social workers, specializes in social and developmental concerns, depression and anxiety, regulatory concerns (including attention, hyperactivity, sleep, and eating problems), behavior challenges, parent-child relationship/attachment concerns, sibling rivalry, grief and other trauma, academic concerns, and developmental delays.

See also
Bank Street College of Education
Pacific Oaks College
Wheelock College
Southwest Human Development

References

External links 

1966 establishments in Illinois
Early childhood education in the United States
Educational institutions established in 1966
Schools of education in Illinois
Universities and colleges in Chicago
Private universities and colleges in Illinois